Samalanga is a district in north coast of Aceh, part of Bireuën Regency. The main occupations of the population are fishing, agriculture and animal husbandry.

Gallery

References 

Lhokseumawe